Niemożliwe Made In Poland is a Polish comedy clip show that began airing on September 11, 2016. It features various viral videos from the Internet, usually involving failed do-it-yourself attempts at stunts, to which Wojciech and his panelists add mock commentary. The Polish Ridiculousness producers, as well as the show's network, MTV, do not accept viewer submissions and air a disclaimer before and after each episode warning that, because of the dangerous nature of the stunts being shown, any attempts to submit a video to the show will be discarded sight unseen. This is the Polish spin-off of the American show Ridiculousness.

Production 
In August 2016, MTV Poland confirmed a new show Niemożliwe Made in Poland which premiered on September 11, 2016. The show is presented by Wojciech "Łozo" Łozowski and co-hosted by Tomasz Torres and Paula Tumala.

On July 10, 2019, Niemożliwe Made in Poland was renewed for a fifteen episode second season, which was produced in 2017. It premiered on August 25, 2019, and included a new co-host Katarzyna Pytel who replaced a former co-host Paula Tumala.

Episodes

Season 1 (2016)

Season 2 (2019)

References 

2016 Polish television series debuts
2019 Polish television series endings
Polish-language television shows
MTV original programming